Express is the second studio album by English rock band Love and Rockets. It was released on 15 September 1986 on Beggars Banquet Records. An even greater departure from the band members' previous work as Bauhaus, the album's fusion of underground rock with pop stylings can be seen as an early example of alternative rock music, a genre that reached mainstream popularity in the early 1990s.

"Kundalini Express" was featured in the 1986 Italian horror film Demons 2 and appeared on an episode of the T.V. show Miami Vice.

Reception 

In their retrospective review, AllMusic gave the album four-and-a-half stars out of five, writing, "rich in sonic detail, the neo-psychedelic Express offers a listening experience like no other album – guitars spiral to dizzying heights from beds of sound, arrangements swirl, songs change and mutate."

Release history 

In 2001, the album was remastered and expanded to include two single remixes and several contemporaneous B-sides, including a cover of Pink Floyd's "Lucifer Sam". Two short experimental pieces that had been found on the studio tape masters labelled as "B Side #1" and "B Side #2" were also added. "Ball of Confusion" was released before Seventh Dream of Teenage Heaven, but since the USA mix could not be fit on the reissue of that album, it was appended to the Express reissue.

Track listings

Personnel 

 Love and Rockets

 Daniel Ash – guitar, saxophone, vocals
 David J – bass guitar, vocals
 Kevin Haskins – drums, synthesizer

 Additional personnel

 Allan Baker – choir master
 Alan Brookes – choir vocalist on "An American Dream"
 James Lowry – choir vocalist on "An American Dream"
 John A. Rivers – additional keyboards
 Robert Willey – choir vocalist on "An American Dream"

 Production
 Love and Rockets – sleeve design
 Mitch Jenkins – sleeve photography

References

External links 

 
 

1986 albums
Love and Rockets (band) albums
Beggars Banquet Records albums
Neo-psychedelia albums